The Nativity of Christ Cathedral, Riga, Latvia was built to a design by Nikolai Chagin and Robert Pflug in a Neo-Byzantine style between 1876 and 1883, with decorations made by the firm of August Volz, during the period when the country was part of the Russian Empire. It is the largest Orthodox cathedral in the Baltic provinces built with the blessing of the Russian Tsar Alexander II  on the initiative of local governor-general Pyotr Bagration  and bishop Veniamin Karelin. The Nativity of Christ Cathedral is renowned for its icons, some of which were painted by Vasili Vereshchagin. During the First World War German troops occupied Riga and turned its largest Russian Orthodox cathedral into a Lutheran church. In independent Latvia, the Nativity of Christ Cathedral once again became an Orthodox cathedral in 1921. Archbishop Jānis Pommers, a native Latvian, played a key part in the defence of the cathedral, including defence from the Latvian government which was extremely unfriendly to Orthodox Church in the first years of an independent Latvia. In the early 1960s, Soviet authorities closed down the cathedral and converted its building into a planetarium. The cathedral has been restored since Latvia regained independence from the Soviet Union in 1991.

Gallery

See also
Neo-Byzantine architecture in the Russian Empire
Latvian Orthodox Church

External links 

About Nativity Cathedral on the portal Other Riga

Churches in Riga
Cathedrals in Latvia
Eastern Orthodox churches in Latvia
Byzantine Revival architecture in Latvia
Churches completed in 1883
19th-century Eastern Orthodox church buildings
Church buildings with domes
19th-century churches in Latvia